Hassan Maatouk is an association football player who plays as a forward for the Lebanon national football team. He is the country's all-time top goalscorer and most-capped player. Since debuting for Lebanon against Saudi Arabia on 27 January 2006, Maatouk has scored 21 goals in 100 international appearances, as of 19 November 2022. His first international goal came five years later in his 20th appearance for his country against Bangladesh.

Maatouk has scored two braces for his national team, scoring twice against Kuwait in a 2–2 draw in a 2014 FIFA World Cup qualifier, and two against Thailand in a 5–2 win in a 2015 AFC Asian Cup qualifier. He has scored more goals against North Korea and Thailand than any other team, with three goals against them. Maatouk has scored more than half of his goals at home, with ten at the Camille Chamoun Sports City Stadium, two at the Saida Municipal Stadium and one at the Tripoli International Olympic Stadium. 

The majority of Maatouk's goals have come in qualification matches, with eight goals having been scored in FIFA World Cup qualifiers, and eight in AFC Asian Cup qualifiers, leading his team to the 2019 edition unbeaten in the qualifiers with five goals in six games. He has also scored four goals in friendlies and one goal in the AFC Asian Cup.

International goals 

:Scores and results list Lebanon's goal tally first, score column indicates score after each Maatouk goal.

Statistics

See also

 List of top international men's association football goal scorers by country
 List of Lebanon international footballers

Notes

References

External links
 
 
 

Maatouk, Hassan
Maatouk, Hassan
Maatouk